The Coloni CN1 is an open-wheel formula racing car, designed, developed, and built Italian manufacturer, team, and constructor, Scuderia Coloni, for the one-make World Series by Nissan spec-series, between 1998 and 2001.

References

Renault Sport Series
Open wheel racing cars